Nugan is a rural locality (an ulus) in Tunkinsky District, Republic of Buryatia, Russia. The population was 244 as of 2010. There are 3 streets.

Geography 
Nugan is located 4 km east of Kyren (the district's administrative centre) by road. Kyren is the nearest rural locality.

References 

Rural localities in Tunkinsky District